The 2013 Macau Open Grand Prix Open was the seventieth grand prix gold and grand prix tournament of the 2013 BWF Grand Prix Gold and Grand Prix. The tournament was held in Macau Forum, Macau November 26 – December 1, 2013 and had a total purse of $120,000.

Men's singles

Seeds

  Kenichi Tago (first round)
  Tanongsak Saensomboonsuk (withdrew)
  Hu Yun (second round)
  Marc Zwiebler (withdrew)
  Wong Wing Ki (third round)
  Rajah Menuri Venkata Gurusaidutt (withdrew)
  Kento Momota (second round)
  Anand Pawar (withdrew)
  Hsu Jen-hao (semi-final)
  Sai Praneeth (first round)
  Vladimir Ivanov (quarter-final)
  Prannoy Kumar (second round)
  Suppanyu Avihingsanon (first round)
  Tan Chun Seang (third round)
  Chan Yan Kit (second round)
  Vladimir Malkov (third round)

Finals

Top half

Section 1

Section 2

Section 3

Section 4

Bottom half

Section 5

Section 6

Section 7

Section 8

Women's singles

Seeds

  Pusarla Venkata Sindhu (champion)
  Nichaon Jindapon (first round)
  Yip Pui Yin (semi-final)
  Pai Hsiao-ma (first round)
  Chan Tsz Ka (quarter-final)
  Deng Xuan (quarter-final)
  Michelle Li (final)
  Cheng Chi-ya (first round)

Finals

Top half

Section 1

Section 2

Bottom half

Section 3

Section 4

Men's doubles

Seeds

  Lee Sheng-mu / Tsai Chia-hsin (final)
  Hoon Thien How / Tan Wee Kiong (champion)
  Maneepong Jongjit / Nipitphon Puangpuapech (quarter-final)
  Vladimir Ivanov / Ivan Sozonov (first round)
  Liang Jui-wei / Liao Kuan-hao (semi-final)
  Gan Teik Chai / Ong Soon Hock (first round)
  Chen Hung-ling / Lu Chia-bin (first round)
  Lim Khim Wah / Ow Yao Han (second round)

Finals

Top half

Section 1

Section 2

Bottom half

Section 3

Section 4

Women's doubles

Seeds

  Poon Lok Yan / Tse Ying Suet (second round)
  Ko A-ra / Yoo Hae-won (semi-final)
  Vivian Hoo Kah Mun / Woon Khe Wei (second round)
  Bao Yixin / Tang Jinhua (champion)

Finals

Top half

Section 1

Section 2

Bottom half

Section 3

Section 4

Mixed doubles

Seeds

  Lee Chun Hei / Chau Hoi Wah (quarter-final)
  Tan Aik Quan / Lai Pei Jing (second round)
  Chan Yun Lung / Tse Ying Suet (quarter-final)
  Ong Jian Guo / Lim Yin Loo (first round)
  Sudket Prapakamol / Savitree Amitrapai (second round)
  Maneepong Jongjit / Sapsiree Taerattanachai (first round)
  Tarun Kona / Ashwini Ponnappa (first round)
  Liao Min-chun / Chen Hsiao-huan (second round)

Finals

Top half

Section 1

Section 2

Bottom half

Section 3

Section 4

References

Macau Open Badminton Championships
Macau Open
Macau Open